Edward Mellish may refer to:

 Edward Noel Mellish (1880–1962), English recipient of the Victoria Cross
 Edward Mellish (priest) (1766–1830), Anglican priest